No Mend No Repair is an EP by Swedish rock band , released in 2001.

Track listing
 "No mend no repair" – 3:45
 "Sleeping pill" – 4:50
 "Playing for a dead audience" – 3:55
 "Life is fair" – 1:16

2001 EPs